Kirby: King of Comics is a 2008 biography of Jack Kirby written by Mark Evanier. The book won the 2009 Eisner Award for Best Comics-Related Book. Published by the art book publisher Abrams Books, it is extensively illustrated with Kirby's artwork, including original art comic pages with production notes in blue ink.

References

2008 non-fiction books
Books about comics
Eisner Award winners
Harvey Award winners
Biographies about writers
Jack Kirby